The MLS Reserve League was a soccer league for the reserve teams of Major League Soccer with teams in both the United States and Canada.

It was inaugurated on April 9, 2005, with the first official reserve game being a 2–0 victory by Chivas USA over the host San Jose Earthquakes. The reserve division disbanded after the 2008 season but returned in 2011 with 18 clubs split into East, Central, and West divisions. Each club played ten games consisting of home-and-away matches versus each of its five divisional opponents.

In 2013, the schedule of the MLS Reserve League was integrated with the schedule of the USL Pro, with teams from each league playing each other.

Format

2005–2008
 Each MLS franchise fielded a reserve division team and played a 12-game schedule (six home, six away). All teams played a minimum of seven opposing reserve division teams at least once throughout the year. The reserve division standings consisted of a single table with the team that finished in first place at the end of the regular season earning the title of reserve division champions and a $20,000 team bonus.
 A total of 20 eligible players for the home team and 20 players for the visiting team could be placed on a club's game roster for any Reserve Division game with each team permitted to make up to six substitutions.
 Suspensions attributable to yellow and red cards issued in Reserve Division games would only be imposed for future Reserve Division matches and not for games during the MLS regular season. Similarly, suspensions attributable to yellow and red cards issued during MLS regular season games would not apply to Reserve Division matches.
 Any player who received four yellow cards during the Reserve Division season would be suspended from the next Reserve Division game in which he could appear.
 No player could play more than 120 minutes in a Reserve Team match and any preceding match(es) that occur within a 60-hour period. Injury time is not considered a part of a player's maximum number of minutes played (e.g., if a player enters a game at halftime and the referee adds 2 minutes of stoppage time to the end of the second half, the player will be considered to have played 45 minutes since the 2 minutes of stoppage time is essentially added to make up for 'lost' time).
 A Reserve Division call-up or "Guest Player" with an MLS team could be eligible to appear in an MLS Reserve Division Game provided that he is properly registered with U.S. Soccer.

2011–2012
 Teams face all but two conference opponents once at home and once away.  The two matches with a USL Pro side count towards the 14 match season, therefore removing two games with MLS reserve sides.
 Teams may at their discretion schedule additional exhibition games for their reserve squads against non-MLS opponents.
 At the conclusion of the Reserve League season, the team with the most points out of all three conferences will be determined the Reserve League Champion.
 All players appearing on an MLS club's roster may represent their team in MLS Reserve League play; however, no player may play more than 120 minutes in a reserve team match and any preceding matches that occur within a sixty-hour period.  Further, no player may play more than a combined total of 90 minutes in a Reserve Team Match and any preceding matches that occurred within 36 hours prior to such reserve team match.
 Clubs may also use up to five academy players per reserve game.
 A Reserve League call-up or "Trialist Player" with a club may appear in reserve league games provided that he is properly registered with US Soccer.  A representative from the MLS Club must also certify that the trialist is a bona fide professional soccer player. Trialists may participate in a maximum of two games per club per season.
 Clubs may play up to a maximum of five non-MLS Roster players per Reserve League Game.  Within the five non-MLS roster player limit, only three players may be trialist players.

2013–2014
In early 2013, MLS and USL reached an agreement to integrate the schedules of the Reserve League and USL Pro. Matches between teams of each league would be scheduled resulting in more games for all clubs. MLS Reserve teams recorded 6 wins, 9 draws, and 11 losses against USL Pro teams in 2013.

2014 was the final Reserve League season. Starting in 2015, MLS clubs must either affiliate with a USL Pro club or create their own team in the USL Pro. The LA Galaxy reserve team joined USL Pro as the LA Galaxy II in 2014 and finished third. MLS Reserve teams recorded 9 wins, 5 draws, and 14 losses against USL Pro teams in 2014.

Past winners

Winners table

Final standings by year

2005

2006

2007

2008

2011

Eastern

Central/Mountain

Western

2012

Eastern

Central/Mountain

Western

2013

East

West

USL Pro
Beginning in 2013, MLS teams could elect to affiliate with a USL Pro team rather than fielding an MLS Reserve League team.

2014

USL Pro
In 2014, the number of MLS teams electing to affiliate with USL Pro teams (rather than fielding an MLS Reserve League team) increased and the LA Galaxy moved their reserve team to compete directly in the USL Pro league.

External links
 MLS 2014 Reserve League page
 Reserve League Handbook

References

Reserve League
United States